The 2012–13 Pro50 Championship was the eleventh edition of the Pro50 Championship, a List A cricket tournament in Zimbabwe. The competition began on 6 October 2012 and the final was played on 19 January 2013.

In the opening round of fixtures, the Mashonaland Eagles had a comfortable victory over the Southern Rocks, while the Mid West Rhinos easily defeated the Matabeleland Tuskers by seven wickets, with the Rhinos openers putting on a partnership of 170 runs in their chase of 211. A second List A century for Vusi Sibanda helped the Rhinos to victory over the Rocks in the second round; he was eventually dismissed for 190. The other game between Mountaineers and the Eagles was postponed following the death of Mashonaland coach Kevin Curran, and the rescheduled match was later abandoned. The third round brought victories for the Rhinos and the Tuskers against the Eagles and Rocks, respectively. The Eagles completed a tense one-wicket win over the Tuskers in round four, while the other game was more one-sided with the Rhinos bowling out the Mountaineers for just 66 runs and then chasing down the target in the 13th over of their reply. In round 5, Graeme Cremer scored an unbeaten 106 and then Glen Querl took his first List A five-for to seal a 132-run win for the Tuskers over the Rhinos. Tino Mawoyo scored his first List A century (an unbeaten 120) and shared and opening stand of 182 with Kevin Kasuza (who scored 85), which made short work of the Mountaineers chase of 267 to beat the Rocks.

The sixth round was affected by rain, with the Tuskers narrowly winning against the Mountaineers by 9 runs on the Duckworth–Lewis method, while the match between the Eagles and the Rocks was abandoned after only 22 overs due to rain. Round seven saw the Eagles cruise to an eight-wicket win over the Mountaineers, with the highlight being an opening stand of 102 between Stuart Matsikenyeri and Sikandar Raza in their chase. Meanwhile the Rhinos thrashed the Rocks by 189 runs, with Vusi Sibanda (106) and Brendan Taylor (134 from 106 deliveries) adding 204 runs for their second wicket. In the eighth round of matches, the Tuskers defeated the Rocks in a match that was reduced to 37 overs per side and the match between the Rhinos and the Eagles was abandoned after less than 10 overs due to rain. In round nine, Sean Ervine top scored with 45 and took three wickets as the Tuskers beat the Eagles to remain top of the table. In the other game, the Mountaineers successfully chased a revised target in a rain-shortened contest against the Rhinos, aided by a century opening stand between Hamilton Masakadza and English batsman Mark Pettini. The final round of the group stage was washed out by rain, with just 11 overs completed in one match and no play at all in the other.

Mashonaland Eagles won the tournament for the second time, defeating the Matabeleland Tuskers by 5 runs in a rain-affected final. Prosper Utseya put in a strong all-round performance, scoring 53 runs batting at number seven to top score for the Eagles before being given out for Obstructing the field and then taking three wickets. Tuskers captain Gavin Ewing scored 94 runs, but his team were just short of the Duckworth–Lewis target when their chase was stopped after 47.5 overs due to rain.

Mid West Rhinos batsman Vusi Sibanda was the tournament's leading run-scorer with a total of 437 runs. Matabeleland Tuskers bowlers Christopher Mpofu and Glen Querl were the joint-leading wicket-tackers with a total of 14 wickets each.

Points table

 Qualified for the final

Results

Round-robin

Final

References

External links
 Series home at ESPN Cricinfo

2012 in Zimbabwean cricket
2013 in Zimbabwean cricket
Pro50 Championship
Pro50 Championship